Mohammed Bakrim is a Moroccan film critic. He is President of the Aflam Association of Film Critics and Journalists (Morocco) and vice president of the African Federation of Film Critics (FACC). Bakrim is also the spokesperson of Morocco's national film center (CCM). Author of numerous analysis and film reviews, he is a regulator contributor to newspaper Libération and magazine Cinémag.

Publications 
 2007: Le Désir permanent. Chroniques cinématographiques
 2011: Impressions itinérantes, Chroniques cinématographiques

References 

Moroccan film critics
Living people
Year of birth missing (living people)